Trazan & Banarne was a Swedish children's television series which was broadcast from 1976 to 1982 on Sveriges Television. For its first season from 1976 to 1977, it was part of the Jullovsmorgon series. The title characters were played by Lasse Åberg (Trazan Apansson) and Klasse Möllberg (Banarne), and they recorded many songs together with the band Electric Banana Band.

The TV series also broadcast TV series such as Lucky Luke.

Plot
The friends Trazan Apansson and Banarne live in a tree house in the jungle with a trampoline. Trazan is a person based on Tarzan and Banarne is a monkey. Generally they have bananas as food. They often tell stories to each other and discuss figures such as the Phantom. They also sing songs by Povel Ramel, Lennart Hellsing and Hans Alfredson.  Trazan plays banjo and Banarne plays guitar.

They are also visited a few times by the stunt man Johan Thorén.

They also go on trips to Toy Museum Stockholm.

Olyckan
In 1980 the TV series was produced together with Swedish Road Administration ("Road Traffic Safety Administration"). Then the character Olyckan ("The Accident") (played by Ted Åström) appeared. He was a character who liked when Banarne made mistakes while driving, but Trazan told Banarne how to drive carefully without accidents.

Pulver & Nicko
Nicko (Klasse Möllberg) and Pulver (Lasse Åberg) were the title characters of the sketch series Pulver & Nicko in the TV series. The sketches take place in the countryside where two dirty and hoarse farmers ask each other riddles and when they hear the answers they fall backwards, laughing. For the New Year's Eve program in 1982 they went to London, Paris and New York.

Rocktajm
Besides the music by Trazan and Banarne, there was a musical segment  called Rocktajm where the rock music band Electric Banana Band appeared. Their songs are based on jungles, bananas, wild animals and Tarzan.

Media

Albums
1977 - Sångtajm med Trazan och Banarne
1978 - E' bananerna fina?!
1979 - Djungelmums
1983 - Banantårta och tigerkaka
1999 - Trazan & Banarnes bäzta! (compilation)
2005 - Electric Banana Bands och Trazan & Banarnes bästa (compilation)
2006 - Det bästa med Trazan & Banarne (compilation)
2008 - Swingtajm!:Trazan och Banarnes 30-års skiva (compilation)
2009 - Three original album classics, reissue of the albums Sångtajm med Trazan och Banarne, E' bananerna fina?! and Djungelmums

Film-TV  
1976-1978 - Trazan & Banarne 
1980 - Trazan Apansson & Banarne 
1980 - Trazan Apansson-E' bananerna fina?
1980 - Trazan Apansson-Djungelmums
1981 - Biotajm med Trazan & Banarne
1982 - Videotajm med Trazan & Banarne 
1998 - Electric Banana Band the Movie - djungelns kojigaste rulle

References

External links
Official website

1976 Swedish television series debuts
1982 Swedish television series endings
Fictional Swedish people
Television duos
Swedish children's television series
Jungle men
Television series about monkeys
1970s Swedish television series
1980s Swedish television series
1970s children's television series
1980s children's television series